Jenny Xie  is an American poet and educator. She is the author of Eye Level, winner of the 2018 Walt Whitman Award of the Academy of American Poets and a finalist of the National Book Award in 2018.

Biography
Jenny Xie was born in Anhui, China and was raised in New Jersey. She graduated from North Brunswick Township High School and Princeton University and earned a graduate degree from New York University. Xie's chapbook, Nowhere to Arrive was published by Northwestern University Press in 2017 and won the 2016 Drinking Gourd Chapbook Poetry Prize.

Xie's poetry collection, Eye Level, was published by Graywolf Press in 2018.  Xie was named winner of the Walt Whitman award given by the Academy of American Poets in 2018. The book was also named a finalist for the National Book Award for Poetry in 2018.
In June 2018, Xie was named winner of the Holmes National Poetry Prize, as a "poet of special merit", selected by the Creative Writing faculty of Princeton University.

Xie was awarded a Vilcek Prize for Creative Promise in Literature by the Vilcek Foundation in 2020.

Xie lives in New York City. She teaches at Bard College and previously taught at New York University.

Awards
  Winner of the Walt Whitman award, Eye Level, (2017)
  Nominated for the National Book Award, 2018, for Eye Level
  Winner of the 2016 Drinking Gourd Chapbook Poetry Prize
  Winner of the Holmes National Poetry Prize in 2018
 Longlisted for the 2019 Dylan Thomas Prize for Eye Level
 Shortlisted for the 2019 PEN Open Book Award for Eye Level
2020 Vilcek Prize for Creative Promise in Literature

References 

Living people
New York University alumni
New York University faculty
Princeton University alumni
21st-century American poets
21st-century American women writers
American women poets
People from Hefei
Chinese emigrants to the United States
Poets from New Jersey
Poets from Anhui
Chinese women poets
Year of birth missing (living people)
American women academics